Caleb Kent Cotham (born November 6, 1987) is an American former professional baseball pitcher, who played in Major League Baseball (MLB) for the New York Yankees (2015) and Cincinnati Reds (2016). He is currently the pitching coach for the Philadelphia Phillies. In 2019–20, Cotham served as the Reds’ assistant pitching coach, eventually becoming the team's director of pitching.

Early life
Cotham attended Mount Juliet High School in Mount Juliet, Tennessee. He graduated in 2006. Cotham attended Vanderbilt University, where he played college baseball for the Vanderbilt Commodores. In 2008 and 2009, Cotham played collegiate summer baseball with the Brewster Whitecaps of the Cape Cod Baseball League.

Professional career

New York Yankees

The New York Yankees selected Cotham in the fifth round of the 2009 Major League Baseball draft. He became a relief pitcher in 2015, recording a 2.21 earned run average (ERA) in 57 innings pitched in the minor leagues.

The Yankees promoted Cotham to the majors for the first time on July 29, 2015. On the same day, he made his Major League debut with the Yankees, pitching one and two-thirds innings, giving up two hits, and striking out four.

Cincinnati Reds
On December 28, 2015, the Yankees traded Cotham, Eric Jagielo, Rookie Davis, and Tony Renda to the Cincinnati Reds, in exchange for Aroldis Chapman. He made the Reds' Opening Day roster in 2016. He underwent season-ending knee surgery in August, finishing the 2016 season with an 0–3 win–loss record and a 7.40 ERA. The Reds outrighted Cotham from their 40-man roster after the season. He opted to become a free agent.

Seattle Mariners
On February 28, 2017, Cotham signed a minor league deal with the Seattle Mariners. On March 10, 2017, Cotham announced his retirement via his Twitter account.

Coaching career

Cincinnati Reds
The Reds hired Cotham as their assistant pitching coach before the 2019 season, where he worked with Derek Johnson, his pitching coach at Vanderbilt. The Reds gave Cotham the added title of director of pitching, following the 2019 season.

Philadelphia Phililes
On November 20, 2020, Cotham was hired to be the team's new pitching coach.

References

External links

Vanderbilt Commodores bio

1987 births
Living people
Baseball coaches from Tennessee
Baseball players from Tennessee
Brewster Whitecaps players
Charleston RiverDogs players
Cincinnati Reds coaches
Cincinnati Reds players
Gulf Coast Yankees players
Major League Baseball pitchers
Major League Baseball pitching coaches
New York Yankees players
People from Mount Juliet, Tennessee
Philadelphia Phillies coaches
Scottsdale Scorpions players
Scranton/Wilkes-Barre RailRiders players
Staten Island Yankees players
Tampa Yankees players
Trenton Thunder players
Vanderbilt Commodores baseball players